The Portland and Southwestern Railroad Tunnel, also known as the Nehalem Divide Railroad Tunnel, is an abandoned railroad tunnel near Scappoose, Oregon, United States, that is listed on the National Register of Historic Places. The tunnel was driven by the Portland and Southwestern Railroad, whose chief business was logging.  Unusually for a logging railroad, the Portland and Southwestern built tunnels.  In order to reach the far side of the Nehalem divide in the Northern Oregon Coast Range, the railroad undertook a  tunnel.  Some work was started in 1910, but most work began in 1918 and was completed in 1919. Since the tunnel was not through solid rock, the tunnel was lined with timber. The tunnel was used until 1945, when it was replaced by a truck road over the divide.

While portions of the tunnel roof have collapsed, the tunnel is still open from end to end.

See also
List of bridges on the National Register of Historic Places in Oregon
List of tunnels documented by the Historic American Engineering Record in Oregon

References

External links
Portland & Southwestern Railroad and the Nehalem Divide Tunnel

Portland & Southwestern Railroad (Nehalem Divide) Tunnel Photos

National Register of Historic Places in Columbia County, Oregon
Railroad tunnels in Oregon
Railway tunnels on the National Register of Historic Places
Transportation buildings and structures in Columbia County, Oregon
Tunnels completed in 1910
1910 establishments in Oregon
Historic American Engineering Record in Oregon
Railway buildings and structures on the National Register of Historic Places in Oregon